Ospelt is a German surname. Notable people with the surname include:

Josef Ospelt (1881–1962), prime Minister of Liechtenstein
Justin Ospelt (born 1999), Bahamian footballer
Oskar Ospelt (1908–1988), Liechtenstein sprinter
Philipp Ospelt (born 1992), Liechtensteiner football striker 
Wolfgang Ospelt (1965–2022), Liechtensteiner former football player

Surnames of Liechtenstein origin

German-language surnames